Clifford M. McClain (born December 29, 1947) is a former American football running back in the National Football League who played for the New York Jets. He played college football for the South Carolina State Bulldogs.

After four seasons as a backup running back with the Jets, before the 1974 season McClain signed as a free agent with the St. Louis Cardinals, who gave the Jets linebacker Jamie Rivers and offensive guard Roger Bernhardt as compensation.  During the 1974 preseason, he was traded to the Chicago Bears as part of a package in exchange for wide receiver Earl Thomas, but he was cut by the Bears.  He went on to play the 1974 season for the Florida Blazers of the World Football League.  McClain attempted to rejoin  the NFL in 1975 but was cut after a tryout with the Atlanta Falcons.

References

1947 births
Living people
American football running backs
New York Jets players
South Carolina State Bulldogs football players
Florida Blazers players